Victoria Saraí Sánchez Meza (born 22 January 2005), known as Victoria Meza, is a Salvadoran footballer who plays as a forward for Liga MX Femenil club CF Pachuca  and  the El Salvador women's national team.

Club career
Meza has played for College Cup in El Salvador.

International career
Meza made her senior debut for El Salvador on 8 April 2021.

Personal life
Meza's uncle is Mario Mayén Meza.

See also
List of El Salvador women's international footballers

References

2005 births
Living people
Salvadoran women's footballers
Women's association football forwards

El Salvador women's international footballers